Bronislaw Onuf-Onufrowicz (July 4, 1863 in  – December 29, 1928 in Rutherford, New Jersey) was a Russian-born American neurologist of Polish descent.

He was born in Yeniseysk, Russia, in 1863, as the son of the physician Adam Onufrowicz and Maria. He attended Industrieschule Zürich and later studied medicine at the Zurich University. He was a pupil of August Forel. Circa 1890 he emigrated to USA. He worked in Pathological Institute of NY State Hospitals under the directorship of Ira Van Gieson and later became lecturer in NY Polyclinic. From 1899, he worked in St. Catherine Hospital, NY. Later he practised in Craig Colony for Epileptics in Sonyea, NY. In the 1920s, he was a consulting neurologist at U.S. Marine Hospital 43, located on Ellis Island. He was a member and vice-president of New York Psychoanalytic Society, member of American Neurological Association (since 1895), secretary and vice-president of the New York Neurological Society.

He is best known for his discovery of group of neurons in spinal cord, Onuf's nucleus.

Selected works

Notes

References
 
 
 

1863 births
1929 deaths
American anatomists
American neurologists
American people of Polish descent
American people of Russian descent